Lee Siegel may refer to:

 Lee Siegel (cultural critic)
 Lee Siegel (professor and novelist)